Sigaloethina is a genus of beach flies, insects in the family Canacidae (formally Tethinidae). All known species are Australasian in distribution.

Species
S. endiomena Munari, 2005
S. phaia Munari, 2004

References

Canacidae
Carnoidea genera